The Battle of the Alamo was a battle fought during the Texas Revolution.

Alamo or The Alamo may also refer to:

Places
Álamo, Veracruz, Mexico
Alamo, California
Alamo, Georgia
Alamo, Indiana
Alamo Township, Michigan
Alamo, Nevada
Alamo, New Mexico
Alamo, North Dakota
Alamo, Tennessee
Alamo, Texas
Alamo Heights, Texas, a suburb of San Antonio
Alamo Mission, a historic Spanish mission in San Antonio, Texas
Alamo River, a river in California

Films
The Alamo: Shrine of Texas Liberty, a 1936 film
The Alamo (1960 film), a film starring John Wayne
The Alamo: 13 Days to Glory, a 1987 film
Alamo: The Price of Freedom, a 1988 IMAX film shown exclusively at San Antonio's Rivercenter Mall Imax theatre
The Alamo (2004 film)

Other uses
Alamo (sculpture), in New York City
Alamo Rent a Car
Alamo Drafthouse Cinema
AA-10 Alamo or Vympel R-27, an air-to-air missile
USS Alamo (LSD-33), a U.S. Navy amphibious assault warship
"Alamo", a song by Tori Amos used as a b-side on "Talula"
Alamo Game Engine, software from Petroglyph Games

People with the name
Antonio Alamo, Jr., American physician and Nevada gaming official
Susan Alamo, American religious figure
Tony Alamo (evangelist), American preacher, singer, entrepreneur, religious evangelist, and convicted child sex offender

See also
Alamo bolide impact
Alamo Scouts
Alamo Village, a movie set turned tourist attraction, in Brackettville, Texas
"Remember the Alamo" (song)
Alameda (disambiguation)